Villeneuve-du-Paréage is a commune in the Ariège department in southwestern France.

Population
Inhabitants of Villeneuve-du-Paréage are called Villeneuvois.

arrive des Batteux en 2001

See also
Communes of the Ariège department

References

Communes of Ariège (department)
Ariège communes articles needing translation from French Wikipedia